Matti Tapio Oivanen (born 26 May 1986 in Huittinen) is a Finnish volleyball player, a member of Finland men's national volleyball team and Finnish club Hurrikaani Loimaa. His twin brother is Mikko Oivanen also volleyball player.

Career
Matti Oivanen was born on 26 May 1986 in Huittinen, Finland, the same day as his brother Mikko Oivanen. He began his volleyball career with his brother, playing for Kiikoisten Kirma. During this time, the pair was selected by coaches for the Finland youth national volleyball team. They moved to Kuortane, Finland, to attend high school, where they trained with the national team until graduation. Oivanen and his brother also played with Vammalan Lentopallo during their last years of high school, until they graduated in 2004.

Raision Loimu 
After leaving Kuortane in 2004, Oivanen signed a contract with the Raision Loimu team, which plays in the Finland volleyball league. While there, he helped the team achieve fourth place in the league championship. During his second season, he helped the team make it to the finals, where they lost to Napapiirin Palloketut.

Pielaveden Sampo 
After two seasons with Loimu, Oivanen left the team and signed with Pielaveden Sampo. His brother signed with Rovaniemen Santasport, marking the first time the two had separated since they started playing volleyball years earlier. Oivanen helped Sampo win the Finland Cup Championship, while they lost the Finland league championship. During his second season with the team, he led them to the Finland Cup Championship, but lost in the finals to Santasport.

Beauvais Oise 
During the 2008–2009 season, Oivanen played in France's Pro A league with Beauvais OUC.

Copra Berni Piacenza 
In 2009–2010 season, Oivanen plays with the Italian Volleyball League club Copra Berni Piacenza.

Yoga Volley Forlì 

During the 2010–2011 season, Matti will play in the A1 Italian League with Yoga Volley Forlì 1975.

In 2013/2014 was a player of Polish team Indykpol AZS Olsztyn.

National team 

Oivanen's first game as a member of the Finland men's national volleyball team was against Germany in the summer of 2005. That year, Finland made it to the Men's European Volleyball League finals and won second place. During the 2007 Men's European Volleyball Championship, the Finland national team won fourth place.

Achievements 
Henkilökohtaiset:

 Finland league All-Stars player 2008
 Best server on the Finland league 2008
 Sport Channel All-Stars player Finland league 2008
 Best newcomer player on the Finland league 2004

Maajoukkueessa:
 European Championships 4. place 2007
 European league silver medal 2005

SM-liigassa:
 Finland league silver 2007, 2008
 Finland Cup Champion 2004, 2006–2007

References

External links 
 PlusLiga player profile

1986 births
Living people
Finnish men's volleyball players
Finnish expatriate sportspeople in Italy
Finnish expatriate sportspeople in Russia
Expatriate volleyball players in Russia
Finnish expatriate sportspeople in France
Expatriate volleyball players in France
Finnish expatriate sportspeople in Poland
Expatriate volleyball players in Poland
AZS Olsztyn players
Sportspeople from Huittinen
Expatriate volleyball players in Italy
Finnish twins
Twin sportspeople